Simancas is an administrative neighborhood (barrio) of Madrid belonging to the district of San Blas-Canillejas. As of 1 February 2020, it has a population of 28,799.

References 

Wards of Madrid
San Blas-Canillejas